Mahaffy is a surname of Scottish origin, and is an Anglicisation of the Gaelic name Mac Dhuibhshithe. It is a sept of Clan Macfie in Scotland, but the clan originated in Ireland. There the name is found largely in County Donegal, Ulster.

People with the surname Mahaffy include: 
 Arthur Arnold Mahaffy (1861–1947), Canadian politician
 James Mahaffy (1905–1986), Canadian politician
 John Mahaffy (ice hockey) (1918-2015), Canadian hockey player 
 John Pentland Mahaffy (1839–1919), Irish academic
 Leslie Mahaffy (1976–1991), Canadian murder victim

See also
 Mahaffey, a variant of the surname

References